Leena Rauhala is a Finnish politician and member of the Parliament of Finland 1999–2015 representing Pirkanmaa.

Career
Rauhala has been a Member of Parliament since 1999. She is a member of the Chancellery Committee, the Finance Committee, the Subcommittee for Education and Science and the Committee for the Future. Previously, she has been a member of the Grand Committee, the Education and Culture Committee, the Social Affairs and Health Committee, the Employment and Equality Committee, the Environment Committee, the Legal Affairs Committee, the Finnish Delegation to the Nordic Council, the Board of the Library of Parliament and the Inter-Parliamentary Union, Finnish Group. In 2004, Rauhala was a candidate for the Chair of the Christian Democrats, finishing third behind Päivi Räsänen and Peter Östman.

References

1942 births
Living people
People from Kouvola
Christian Democrats (Finland) politicians
Members of the Parliament of Finland (1999–2003)
Members of the Parliament of Finland (2003–07)
Members of the Parliament of Finland (2007–11)
Members of the Parliament of Finland (2011–15)
Finnish nurses
21st-century Finnish women politicians
Women members of the Parliament of Finland